Anupama Niranjana (1934–1991) was a doctor in India and writer of modern Kannada fiction and non-fiction.

She advocated the woman's point of view and was one among  such writers in Kannada, which  includes others like Triveni and M. K. Indira. Her novel Runamuktalu was made into a film by Puttanna Kanagal.

Born Venkatalakshmi, Anupama practiced as a physician in Dharwad and Bangalore. Anupama took to writing early in life and wrote several novels and stories dealing with social issues, particularly women's issue. She was married to the Kannada writer Niranjana, a novelist of the Progressive school of modern Kannada literature. Their daughters Tejaswini and Seemanthini are academics. 

Anupama died of cancer. An award has been instituted in her name for women writing in Kannada.

Major works

Anant Geetha
Shwetambari
Sneh Pallavi
Runamuktalu
Kanmani
Odalu
Nenapu: Sihi-Kahi
Kallol
Aala
Mukti Chitra
Madhavi
Ghosha
Nati
Moolamukhi (last novel)
Cancer Jagattu
Taayi magu
Dinakkondu kathe (collection of children's stories)

Major awards
Karnataka Sahitya Akademi Award
Soviet Land Nehru Award
Kannada Rajyotsava

References

1934 births
1991 deaths
Kannada-language writers
Women writers from Karnataka
Kannada people
Indian medical writers
20th-century Indian medical doctors
Indian women medical doctors
Indian women children's writers
Indian children's writers
Indian women novelists
20th-century Indian women writers
20th-century Indian novelists
Indian women short story writers
20th-century Indian short story writers
People from Shimoga district
Novelists from Karnataka
Women scientists from Karnataka
Medical doctors from Karnataka
20th-century women physicians